Lakha is a village in the Kaij tehsil of Beed district in the state of Maharashtra, India. The village is administrated by a sarpanch who is an elected representative of village according to the Constitution of India and the Panchayati raj in India.

Location 
Lakha village is located on the border of Osmanabad and Beed districts, on the right (south) bank of the Manjara River, just west of the Manjara Dam Reservoir.

References

External links
 Map of Lakha Village in Kaij Tehsil, Bid, Maharashtra, Maps of India

Villages in Beed district